Langelurillus rufus is  a jumping spider species  that lives in Ethiopia and Tanzania. The male was originally described by Lessert in 1925 and named Langona rufa while male and female samples were named Langelurillus difficilis by Wesołowska and Russell-Smith in 2000.  The species were transferred to the genus Langelurillus by Wesołowska with the current name in 2012.

References

Fauna of Ethiopia
Fauna of Tanzania
Salticidae
Spiders of Africa
Spiders described in 1925